The 1982 Florence Open was a men's tennis tournament played on outdoor clay courts in Florence, Italy that was part of the 1982 Volvo Grand Prix circuit. It was the tenth edition of the tournament and was played from 10 May until 16 May 1982. Second-seeded Vitas Gerulaitis won the singles title.

Finals

Singles
 Vitas Gerulaitis defeated  Stefan Simonsson 4–6, 6–3, 6–1
 It was Gerulaitis' 2nd singles title of the year and the 21st of his career.

Doubles
 Paolo Bertolucci /  Adriano Panatta defeated  Tony Giammalva /  Sammy Giammalva 7–6, 6–1

References

External links
 ITF tournament edition details

Alitalia Florence Open
Alitalia Florence Open
ATP Florence
Tennis tournaments in Italy